Diplacodes trivialis is a species of dragonfly in the family Libellulidae known as the chalky percher or ground skimmer. It is found in China, Japan, India and southwards to New Guinea and Australia.

Description and habitat
Diplacodes trivialis is small dragonfly with bluish eyes and greenish-yellow or olivaceous thorax and abdomen with black marks. In very old adults, the whole thorax and abdomen become uniform pruinosed blue. Clear wings, without apical or basal markings, and the creamy white anal appendages and deep pruinescence in adults help to distinguish this species from others in its genus. It breeds in ponds, wet rice fields, shallow lakes, drainage ditches and similar habitats. It is one of the most common dragonflies in Asia, found in both the plains and hills and in dry and wet areas.

Gallery

See also
 List of odonates of Sri Lanka
 List of odonates of India
 List of odonata of Kerala
 List of Odonata species of Australia

References

External links

Libellulidae
Odonata of Oceania
Odonata of Asia
Odonata of Australia
Insects of New Guinea
Insects of India
Taxa named by Jules Pierre Rambur
Insects described in 1842